Donny Isaak (born June 10, 1969) is an American former professional tennis player.

Isaak, a native of Carroll, Iowa, played collegiate tennis for the University of Southern California. He was a member of USC's 1991 NCAA championship team, as well as an NCAA singles semi-finalist and All-American that year.

In the early 1990s he competed on the professional tour and reached a best singles world ranking of 288. He made a doubles main draw appearance at Indian Wells in 1991, partnering Swede David Ekerot.

ATP Challenger finals

Doubles: 2 (0–2)

References

External links
 
 

1969 births
Living people
American male tennis players
USC Trojans men's tennis players
Tennis people from Iowa
People from Carroll, Iowa